Oregon Highway 50 may refer to:

For the former OR 50, see Oregon Route 50.
For the unsigned Highway 50, see Klamath Falls-Malin Highway.
For the former unsigned Highway 50, see Klamath Falls-Weed Highway.